The Galley Slave (1915 film)
 The Galley Slave (1919 film)